Vanesa Gabriela Leiro (born May 6, 1992) is an Argentine actress and singer.

Life
Leiro was born in Buenos Aires. She took part in the children's contest Super Pop Kids in 2001 and she won the contest La Banda de Cantaniño in 2002 and 2003 with her band KtrasK.

She has later taken part in several television programs.

Filmography

References

External links 
 

1992 births
Living people
Argentine actresses
21st-century Argentine women singers
Singers from Buenos Aires